Park Bo-young (born February 12, 1990) is a South Korean actress.

Film

Television series

Reality/variety show

Radio program

Documentary

Hosting

Narration

Music video appearance

Advertising

Notes

References

South Korean filmographies